This is a list of all officers who achieved the rank of general-officer in the Empire of Brazil.

Generals

Brigadier
Francisco José Damasceno Rosado
Francisco Xavier da Cunha
Jerônimo Francisco Coelho
João de Castro Canto e Melo, 2nd Viscount of Castro
José Manuel Carlos de Gusmão
José Mariano de Matos
José de Sá Bitencourt Câmara
Miguel de Frias e Vasconcelos

Field marshal
Francisco Félix da Fonseca Pereira Pinto
Francisco Sérgio de Oliveira
Jacinto Pinto de Araújo Corrêa
João Eduardo Pereira Colaço Amado
João José da Costa Pimentel
João Propício Mena Barreto, 2nd Baron of São Gabriel
José Leite Pacheco
José Luís Mena Barreto
Lopo de Almeida Henriques Botelho e Melo
Luís Manuel de Lima e Silva
Manuel Felizardo de Sousa e Melo
Manuel Muniz Tavares
Pedro de Alcântara Bellegarde
Solidônio José Antônio Pereira do Lago
Venceslau de Oliveira Belo

Lieutenant general
Henrique Marques de Oliveira Lisboa
João Frederico Caldwell
Joaquim Xavier Curado, Count of São João das Duas Barras (infantry) 
José Egídio Gordilho de Barbuda, 2nd Viscount of Camamú
José Fernandes dos Santos Pereira
José Joaquim Coelho, Baron of Vitória
José Maria da Silva Bittencourt
Luís da França Pinto Garcês
Manuel Marques de Sousa (cavalry) 
Manuel Marques de Sousa, Count of Porto Alegre
Manuel de Sousa Pinto de Magalhães, Baron of Turiaçu
Polidoro da Fonseca Quintanilha Jordão, Viscount of Santa Teresa

Army marshal
Carlos Frederico Lecor, Viscount of Laguna
Francisco Xavier Calmon da Silva Cabral, 3rd Baron of Itapajipe
Henrique Pedro Carlos de Beaurepaire-Rohan, Viscount of Beaurepaire-Rohan
João Carlos Pardal
João Paulo dos Santos Barreto
José da Vitória Soares de Andréa
Luís Alves de Lima e Silva, Duke of Caxias
Gaston of Orléans, Count of Eu
Manuel Antônio da Fonseca Costa, Marquis of Gávea
Manuel da Fonseca de Lima e Silva, Baron of Suruí
Manuel Luís Osório, Marquis of Erval

References

Bibliography

 
 
 

Empire of Brazil, List Of Generals Of The
Generals
Empire of Brazil
Empire of Brazil